Hercule Poirot is a series of full cast BBC Radio drama adaptations of Agatha Christie's Hercule Poirot novels and short stories adapted by Michael Bakewell, broadcast on BBC Radio 4 between 1985 and 2007. With the exception of the first two adaptations, the series stars John Moffatt as Poirot.

Production
The series consists of 27 full cast radio adaptations of Agatha Christie's Hercule Poirot stories, adapted by Michael Bakewell and broadcast on BBC Radio 4.

After the first adaptation, the six episode The Mystery of the Blue Train of 1985 (directed by David Johnston), all following productions were directed and produced by Enyd Williams. For Williams's first production, Hercule Poirot's Christmas, Peter Sallis played Poirot, but she recalled in The Radio Detectives that "I enjoyed very much working with Peter Sallis...but he's not a very happy person doing accents so we decided to leave it there." She subsequently cast John Moffatt, a member of the Radio Drama Company, in the role and he reprised the part for a further 25 productions between 1987 and 2007.

Adaptations in the series were released on CD and are regularly rebroadcast on BBC Radio 4 Extra. According to a press release in December 2020, Hercule Poirot episodes are one of the most requested programmes on BBC Sounds alongside Miss Marple.

Cast
The main character, private detective Hercule Poirot, appears in each production and was played by John Moffatt in all the dramatisations except the first two, in which he was played by Maurice Denham and Peter Sallis respectively.

Captain Hastings, Poirot's companion in several stories, was played by Simon Williams in Lord Edgware Dies, The ABC Murders, Peril at End House, The Mysterious Affair at Styles, and Dumb Witness, and Jeremy Clyde in Murder on the Links. Police detective Inspector Japp was played by Philip Jackson in The ABC Murders, Death In The Clouds, One, Two, Buckle My Shoe, and The Mysterious Affair at Styles, Norman Jones in Lord Edgware Dies, and Bryan Pringle in Peril at End House.

Crime fiction writer Ariadne Oliver was played by Stephanie Cole in Hallowe'en Party and Cards on the Table, and Julia McKenzie in Elephants Can Remember, Mrs McGinty's Dead, and Dead Man's Folly. Colonel Race, a British intelligence agent, was played by Donald Sinden in Death on the Nile and Cards on the Table.

Multiple actors played different characters in separate adaptations. For instance, Donald Sinden, who played Colonel Race, also played Colonel Lacey in The Adventure of the Christmas Pudding. Two other examples are Mary Wimbush, who played Mrs Lorrimer in Cards on the Table and Mrs Leadbetter in Taken at the Flood, and Michael Cochrane, who played Sir Charles Cartwright in Three Act Tragedy and Sir George Stubbs in Dead Man's Folly.

List of adaptations

Reception
The Sunday Times wrote in 2004 that "Radio 4...relies on the same clever but unpublicised creative trio it has had since the 1980s: John Moffatt, who plays Poirot with such finesse, Michael Bakewell, who adapts the stories with clarify and affection; and Enyd Williams, the producer and director." Moffatt's portrayal of Hercule Poirot is cited in his obituaries as the definitive radio portrayal of the character.

See also
Miss Marple (radio series)
Lord Peter Wimsey (radio series)
Sherlock Holmes (1989 radio series)

References

External links

Hercule Poirot
BBC Radio 4 programmes
Lists of radio series episodes
Detective radio shows